Jayapura Regency is one of the regencies (kabupaten) in Papua Province of Indonesia. It is situated to the west of but does not include the city of Jayapura. Previously covering most of the north-east portion of Papua province, it was reduced substantially in extent from 12 November 2002, when the eastern districts were split off to form a new Keerom Regency and the western districts were split off to form a new Sarmi Regency. It now covers an area of 17,516.6 km2, and had a population of 111,943 at the 2010 Census and 166,171 at the 2020 Census; the official estimate as at mid 2021 was 168,476. The administrative centre is the district of Sentani, with 72,443 inhabitants in mid 2021.

Administrative districts
Following the 2002 reductions in area, the existing regency comprises nineteen districts (distrik), tabulated below with their areas and their populations at the 2010 Census and the 2020 Census, together with the official estimates as at mid 2021. The table also includes the location of the districts' administrative centres, the number of villages (rural desa and urban kelurahan) in each district, and its post code.

Notes: (a) formerly Nimboran Timur (East Nimboran). (b) including 9 offshore islands. (c) including 6 offshore islands. (d) including 4 offshore islands. (e) including 3 offshore islands.

Tourism

Since end of 2014, Infote (also called Love Lake, Danau Love, Telaga Love, or Telaga Hati) has become popular as a tourist attraction. Named for its shape, the Love Lake lays in Central Sentani, which can be accessed from Keerom Regency or from Jayapura through Yoka Village.

Sport
As the 2021 edition of National Sports Week (PON) is hosted in Papua Province, Jayapura Regency is selected as one of the games venues. Lukas Enembe Stadium in Sentani Timur District was built as the 2021 PON main venue.

References

External links
Statistics publications from Statistics Indonesia (BPS)

Regencies of Papua (province)
 
Jayapura